Rhyzodiastes bonsae is a species of ground beetle in the subfamily Rhysodinae. It was described by R.T. & J.R. Bell in 1985. It is found on Sumatra (Indonesia).

References

Rhyzodiastes
Beetles of Indonesia
Fauna of Sumatra
Beetles described in 1985